Binjai United Football Club (simply known as BUFC or Binjai United) is an Indonesian football club based in Binjai, North Sumatra. They currently compete in the Liga 3 and their homeground is PTPN II Tandam Hulu Field.

References

External links
Binjai United FC Instagram

Binjai
Football clubs in Indonesia
Football clubs in North Sumatra
Association football clubs established in 2015
2015 establishments in Indonesia